3 Ninjas Kick Back is a 1994 American martial arts film directed by Charles T. Kanganis. It is a sequel to the film 3 Ninjas. Despite being released as the second installment of the franchise, Kick Back is chronologically the third installment of the 3 Ninjas series. Originally the other sequel 3 Ninjas Knuckle Up was shot back-to-back with the first film and with the original cast, but due to distribution issues it was released in 1995. Max Elliott Slade is the only actor to reprise his role from the previous films as Jeffrey "Colt" Douglas, one of the three main characters. The film has a continuity error in which Mori's last name changes from Tanaka to Shintaro for no apparent reason.

It is the only film in the series to receive a video game adaptation.

Plot
The three titular ninjas of the story, 14-year-old "Rocky", 13-year-old "Colt", and 8-year-old "Tum-Tum" are brothers experiencing the pressures of growing up. They frequently spend time training in the ninja arts with their grandfather, Mori Shintaro (Mori Tanaka in the previous film). Mori plans a trip for the four of them to Japan to take them to a martial arts tournament of which he was the champion fifty years ago. Only Tum-Tum seems interested in going, and even then, only out of interest in seeing sumo wrestlers due to how much food they get to eat. Mori tells the boys he hopes to return a dagger awarded to him at the tournament when he defeated a boy named Koga, so that it may be presented to the new winner. In Japan, a man later revealed to be Koga breaks into a museum and steals a sword before escaping via hang glider. At a baseball game, Rocky seems too focused on a cute girl to pitch properly, Tum-Tum causes constant breaks due to getting snacks, and Colt's temper causes a fight with the opposing team that causes the umpire to call off the game until the next week, driving a nail into the boys' plans to travel.

Meanwhile, back at Mori's cabin, a trio of thugs led by Koga's nephew, Glam, try to break into the house to steal the dagger. The boys manage to drive them off and dismiss it as an ordinary robbery attempt. Mori leaves for Japan alone, but the boys' father, Sam, accidentally gives him Tum-Tum's bag. Once he arrives in Japan, Mori's taxi is rear-ended by Glam and his friends, who steal his bag. After hearing from Mori at the hospital, the boys discover the bag mix-up and realize that they have the dagger. They arrange a trip with Mori's credit card and meet him in Japan. He instructs the boys to give the dagger to the Grand Master of the tournament. Glam and his friends record the conversation and deliver it to Koga, who punishes them for not retrieving the dagger. At the tournament, Colt takes the place of a fallen competitor but is promptly beaten by a girl named Miyo Shikigawa, wounding his pride. She helps them deliver the dagger to the Grand Master, and allows the boys to stay with her and her mother. She has a love of baseball, she is a good power hitter, but is not very good at catching. The boys offer to train her in baseball if she trains them in martial arts.

Koga attempts to trap the boys and retrieve the dagger himself by pretending to be the Grand Master, but the boys and Miyo catch onto his scheme and flee. They face several adversaries before they are finally captured. Meanwhile, Mori is kidnapped from the hospital by Ishikawa after fleeing Glam and the others. Koga forces Mori to tell him the location of the Cave of Gold, an urban legend which the sword and dagger are the keys to open. Fearing the safety for his grandsons, Mori agrees to aid Koga. Soon after, the children come up with a plan and escape Koga's fortress on hang gliders, arriving at the cave shortly after the adults. Inside, Koga and Mori realize the legend is true after they encounter walls and monuments of gold within. While the two battle each other, the boys and Miyo drop in on them and Koga pulls a gun. Using Mori's lesson on focus, Colt throws a ball bearing into the muzzle of the gun, causing it to backfire and start a cave-in. The group flees the cave, and Koga, now realizing the price of his greed, apologizes and leaves the group unharmed. Rocky realizes that they are a day ahead of America and that they can still make it home by the championship game.

At the game, the boys overcome their flaws. Down by two in the 9th inning, an opposing batter gets a hit off Rocky's pitch, until a new player, Miyo, catches the ball. In the bottom of the inning, Colt focuses and hits a home run, allowing all three boys to score and win the game. Members of the opposing team confront them after the game, and Darren (their leader) picks Miyo to fight for ruining his home run. Miyo politely agrees and Darren screams as she readies to attack him. The screen cuts to black as the fight begins.

Cast

Reception
The film had a mostly negative reaction. On Rotten Tomatoes the film has an approval rating of 15% based on reviews from 13 critics, with one reviewer calling it, "the most racist kids movie since Song of the South". Scott Weinberg of eFilmCritic.com gave it 1 out of 5, saying it was, "even worse than the original ... which was pretty dire to begin with". On Metacritic, the film has a score of 39 out of 100 based on 14 reviews, indicating "generally unfavorable reviews".

Box office
The film opened in the #3 position on opening weekend with a total of US$3,556,310. By the end of its 4-week run, the movie grossed $11,798,854 domestically.

Other media
In 1994, NOW Comics published a three part comic book adaptation of the movie, which was written by Clint McElroy.

In 1994, Sony Imagesoft published a video game adaption for the Sega Genesis, SNES, and Sega CD platforms.

References

External links
 
 

1994 films
1994 action comedy films
1994 martial arts films
American sequel films
TriStar Pictures films
American action comedy films
1990s English-language films
Kick Back
Films about brothers
Films directed by Charles T. Kanganis
Films set in Japan
Films set in the United States
American martial arts comedy films
Films adapted into comics
Ninja films
Films shot in Japan
Japan in non-Japanese culture
1994 comedy films
1990s American films